Robert L. Millet (born 30 December 1947) is a professor of ancient scripture and emeritus Dean of Religious Education at Brigham Young University (BYU) in Provo, Utah. Millet is a Latter-day Saint author and speaker with more than 60 published works on virtually all aspects of Mormonism.  Millet was at the forefront of establishing evangelical-Mormon dialogue.

He appears frequently as a commentator on BYUtv and in other visible roles at assorted media outlets as Manager of Outreach and Interfaith Relations for the LDS Church's Public Affairs Department. 

Millet is considered one of the foremost scholars on the Joseph Smith Translation (also known as the Inspired Version) of the Bible.

Life
Millet was born and raised in Louisiana where his grandparents had joined the LDS Church. He received a BA and a master's in psychology from BYU, and a Ph.D. from Florida State University in biblical studies and contemporary theology. Millet has been a member of the BYU faculty since 1983.

Millet married Shauna Sizemore Millet at the Salt Lake Temple in 1971; they are the parents of six children.

Select bibliography

References

External links 
 
 
 Deseret Book author information
 

1947 births
Living people
American Latter Day Saint writers
American theologians
Brigham Young University alumni
Brigham Young University faculty
Florida State University alumni
Latter Day Saints from Louisiana
Latter Day Saint biblical scholars